Amy Beth Schumer (born June 1, 1981) is an American stand-up comedian, actress, writer, and director. Schumer ventured into comedy in the early 2000s before appearing as a contestant on the fifth season of the NBC reality competition series Last Comic Standing in 2007. From 2013 to 2016, she was the creator, co-producer, co-writer, and star of the Comedy Central sketch comedy series Inside Amy Schumer, for which she received a Peabody Award and was nominated for five Primetime Emmy Awards, winning Outstanding Variety Sketch Series in 2015.

Schumer wrote and made her film debut in a starring role in Trainwreck (2015), for which she received nominations for the Writers Guild of America Award for Best Original Screenplay and the Golden Globe Award for Best Actress – Motion Picture Comedy or Musical. She published a memoir in 2016, The Girl with the Lower Back Tattoo, which held the top position on The New York Times Non-Fiction Best Seller list for two weeks. The same year, she was nominated for two Grammy Awards: for Best Comedy Album for Amy Schumer: Live at the Apollo, and Best Spoken Word Album for The Girl with the Lower Back Tattoo. In 2018, she starred in the comedy film I Feel Pretty and garnered a Tony Award for Best Actress in a Play nomination for her Broadway debut in Meteor Shower.

Early life and background 
Schumer was born on June 1, 1981, on the Upper East Side of Manhattan, New York City, New York, to Sandra Jane (née Jones) and Gordon David Schumer, who owned a baby-furniture company.

Schumer's father was born to a Jewish family from Ukraine. She is a second cousin of U.S. Senator and Senate Majority Leader Chuck Schumer. Her mother, who is from a Protestant background and has deep New England roots, converted to Judaism before her marriage. Schumer was raised Jewish and says she had to deal with antisemitism as a child. 

Her mother's ancestry included Puritans in the 17th-century English colony of Massachusetts. As a guest on Finding Your Roots in 2017, Schumer learned that in 1704, three children from her ancestor Thomas Tarbell's family were captured at Groton, Massachusetts, in a French-Abenaki raid and taken to Montreal. The girl was ransomed by a French-Canadian family and ultimately joined a French Catholic convent; the two boys were each adopted by Mohawk families at Kahnawake and became thoroughly assimilated. They married Mohawk women and some of their descendants became chiefs. There are still Mohawk by the surname Tarbell in Kahnawake and Akwesasne, another village reserve on the St. Lawrence River founded by the brothers.

Through the success of her father's furniture company in Manhattan, Schumer's household was wealthy during her early years. When she was nine years old, her father's business failed and he went bankrupt, and either then or when she was 12 (sources differ), her father was diagnosed with multiple sclerosis. Some time afterward, her parents divorced. 

Moving to Long Island with her mother, Schumer lived in Rockville Centre, New York, and attended South Side High School. She was voted both "Class Clown" and "Teacher's Worst Nightmare" upon graduation in 1999. She attended the Hebrew school of the Central Synagogue of Nassau County, a Reform synagogue in Rockville Centre, on whose board her mother served.

Schumer moved near Baltimore, Maryland, after high school when she attended Towson University; she graduated with a degree in theater in 2003. She returned to New York City after college, where she studied at the William Esper Studio for two years and worked as a bartender and a waitress. She also for a period relocated to Santa Barbara, California (with a boyfriend she characterized as abusive), where she worked as a pedicab driver.

She has a younger sister, Kim Caramele, who is a comedy writer and a producer, and a half-brother, Jason Stein, who is a musician in Chicago, Illinois.

Career 
After graduating with a degree in theater from Towson University in 2003 and moving to New York City, Schumer portrayed a young woman diagnosed with breast cancer in the Off-Off-Broadway black comedy Keeping Abreast. She started doing stand-up comedy on June 1, 2004, when she first performed at Gotham Comedy Club. In 2007, she recorded a Live at Gotham episode for Comedy Central before appearing on Last Comic Standing; she later recalled that she thought of the episode as her "big break".

Rebounding from an unsuccessful audition for an earlier season, she advanced to the finals of the fifth season of the NBC reality television talent show Last Comic Standing and placed fourth. Schumer said in April 2011, "Last Comic was totally fun. I had a great time because there was no pressure on me; I had been doing stand-up around two years. I wasn't supposed to do well. So every time I advanced it was a happy surprise. I kept it honest on the show and it served me well."

Schumer co-starred in the Comedy Central reality show Reality Bites Back in 2008. In 2009, she appeared in an advertising campaign for Butterfinger. Schumer was a recurring guest on Fox News late-night program Red Eye w/ Greg Gutfeld between 2007 and 2012. Her first Comedy Central Presents special aired on April 2, 2010. She served as a co-host of A Different Spin with Mark Hoppus in 2011, later titled Hoppus on Music. She has also written for Cosmopolitan.

Schumer did an episode (#154) of WTF with Marc Maron podcast on March 3, 2011, in which she discusses her early life in more detail. Schumer has appeared in roles on the NBC comedy series 30 Rock, the Adult Swim mockumentary series Delocated, and the two HBO series, Curb Your Enthusiasm and Girls. She was also a frequent guest on The Howard Stern Show and the Opie and Anthony radio show.

She acted in three films in 2012: the independent comedy Price Check, the comedy-drama Seeking a Friend for the End of the World, and the independent comedy Sleepwalk with Me. Schumer also appeared on The Comedy Central Roast of Charlie Sheen in September 2011, and The Comedy Central Roast of Roseanne Barr in August 2012.

Schumer released a stand-up comedy album, Cutting, in 2011. Her stand-up comedy special Mostly Sex Stuff premiered on Comedy Central on August 18, 2012, to positive reviews. Schumer said in February 2012, "I don't like the observational stuff. I like tackling the stuff nobody else talks about, like the darkest, most serious thing about yourself. I talk about life and sex and personal stories and stuff everybody can relate to, and some can't."

In June 2012, Schumer began work on a sketch comedy series for Comedy Central. The show included single-camera vignettes of Schumer playing "heightened versions" of herself. The vignettes are linked together with footage of Schumer's stand-up. The show, Inside Amy Schumer, premiered on Comedy Central on April 30, 2013. Inside Amy Schumer was picked up for a second season that began in 2014. A behind-the-scenes miniseries entitled Behind Amy Schumer premiered in 2012. The third season premiered on April 21, 2015, with a fourth season ordered the same day.

In 2014, Schumer embarked on her Back Door Tour to promote the second season of her show. The show was closed by Bridget Everett, whom Schumer cites as her favorite live performer. She also appeared as a guest on an episode of comedian Jerry Seinfeld's Internet series Comedians in Cars Getting Coffee in 2014.

She hosted the 2015 MTV Movie Awards, which took place on April 11. Schumer wrote and played her first leading film role in Trainwreck, co-starring Bill Hader, which was released on July 17, 2015.

In August 2015, Jennifer Lawrence said she and Schumer planned to co-star in a film for which they and Schumer's sister Kim were co-writing a screenplay. However, Schumer later revealed the project was on the "back burner". Schumer performed as opening act for Madonna on three New York City dates of the singer's Rebel Heart Tour in September 2015.

On October 17, 2015, Schumer's comedy special Amy Schumer: Live at the Apollo premiered on HBO. In 2016, it was nominated for three Primetime Emmy Awards for Outstanding Variety Special, Writing, and Directing. It also garnered her a nomination for the Grammy Award for Best Comedy Album.

Schumer started her first world tour on August 26 in Dublin. Also that year, Schumer wrote a memoir, entitled The Girl with the Lower Back Tattoo. It held the top position on The New York Times Non-Fiction Best Seller list for two weeks in September 2016 and garnered her a nomination for the Grammy Award for Best Spoken Word Album.

Schumer made her Broadway debut in 2017 with Steve Martin's comedy play Meteor Shower, about two couples in 1993 who spend an evening with each other. Her performance received acclaim and garnered her a nomination for the Tony Award for Best Actress in a Play. In 2018, she starred in the comedy film I Feel Pretty.

Spotify released the original podcast Amy Schumer Presents: 3 Girls, 1 Keith on June 21, 2018, starring Schumer and her best comedy friends Rachel Feinstein, Bridget Everett and Keith Robinson as they talk about comedy, pop culture, politics and their personal lives.

In May 2020, Schumer alongside her husband Chris Fischer starred in an eight-episode cooking show Amy Schumer Learns to Cook, for Food Network which followed Schumer and Fischer cooking while quarantined during the COVID-19 pandemic. The series was self-shot and also featured Schumer donating to The Coalition of Immokalee Workers Fair Food Program and domestic violence organizations. It premiered on May 11, 2020. She next appeared in a documentary series Expecting Amy, which she also executive produced, following Schumer preparing for a stand-up special while going through a difficult pregnancy for HBO Max, which premiered on July 9, 2020.

Schumer appeared in the 2021 film The Humans, based upon play of the same name directed by Stephen Karam. She wrote, directed, and starred in Life & Beth, a 10-episode comedy series for Hulu which premiered on March 18, 2022. The revival of her sketch series Inside Amy Schumer, which had been on hiatus since 2016, was announced in February 2021, with five additional specials to be released through Paramount+.

In January 2022, she was cast as a guest role for season two of Only Murders in the Building. She co-hosted the 94th Academy Awards with Regina Hall and Wanda Sykes on March 27, 2022. In June, she joined the cast of Jerry Seinfeld's Unfrosted: The Pop-Tart Story.

Influences 
Schumer's comedic influences include Wendy Liebman, Carol Burnett, Lucille Ball, and Joan Rivers. Additionally, she called actress-producer Goldie Hawn one of her "heroes".

In the media 

In 2015, Schumer was named one of Time magazine's 100 most influential people. In 2015, Schumer was also named to Barbara Walters' 10 Most Fascinating People list for 2015. Schumer has received praise for addressing various social issues through comedy.

In June 2015, Monica Heisey of The Guardian criticized her for "a shockingly large blind spot around race". Schumer responded on Twitter, stating "I go in and out of playing an irreverent idiot. That includes making dumb jokes involving race ... You can call it a 'blind spot for racism' or 'lazy,' but you are wrong. It is a joke ... I am not racist." Schumer was again criticized in July 2020 by Kyndall Cunningham of The Daily Beast for her earlier work, which included "objectifying black men" and calling Latina women "crazy". Cunningham described her "sudden" decision to support the Black Lives Matter movement as "befuddling and laughable".

Throughout 2015, several of Schumer's skits in Inside Amy Schumer went viral online, sparking think pieces regarding sex, feminism, and rape culture.

After a fatal shooting took place at a showing of Trainwreck in Louisiana, Schumer advocated for stricter gun control laws and increased mental health funding.

In November 2015, Schumer posed nude for a photo by photographer Annie Leibovitz for 2016 edition of the Pirelli Calendar. Schumer tweeted the photo, writing "Beautiful, gross, strong, thin, fat, pretty, ugly, sexy, disgusting, flawless, woman. Thank you."

In January 2016, Schumer was accused of stealing jokes from comedians Tammy Pescatelli, Kathleen Madigan, Wendy Liebman, and Patrice O'Neal. Schumer denied the allegations. Other comedians, such as Marc Maron and Dave Rubin, defended Schumer. Pescatelli later apologized, stating it had "gone too far" and was probably "parallel thinking".

On October 4, 2018, Schumer was arrested at the US Capitol while protesting the nomination of Brett Kavanaugh as an Associate Justice of the United States Supreme Court.

She has also used her role as a comedian to encourage higher voter turnout and spread awareness about voter ID laws.

Personal life 
Schumer has dated professional wrestler Nick Nemeth, better known by his ring name Dolph Ziggler, and comedian Anthony Jeselnik. Schumer married chef and farmer Chris Fischer on February 13, 2018, in Malibu, California. In October 2018, she announced that she was expecting their first child. On May 5, 2019, Schumer gave birth to a boy, Gene. Schumer initially gave Gene the middle name Attell—in honor of comedian Dave Attell—but changed it to David after realizing that "Gene Attell" sounded like "genital". Her son was born by caesarean section because of her endometriosis. In September 2021, Schumer had her uterus removed to alleviate symptoms related to the condition.

Acting credits

Film

Television

Stage 
 Meteor Shower (2017, Broadway)

Discography

Albums 
 2011: Cutting (Comedy Central Records) - CD/Download/Streaming
 2016: Live at the Apollo (Maverick Records) - Download/Streaming
 2017: The Leather Special (Netflix) - LP

Videos 
 2010: Comedy Central Presents - DVD/Download/Streaming
 2013: Mostly Sex Stuff (Comedy Central 2012) - DVD/Download/Streaming
 2015: Live at the Apollo (HBO Home Video) - DVD/Download/Streaming
 2017: The Leather Special (Netflix) - Streaming
 2019: Growing (Netflix) - Streaming

Audiobook 
 2016: The Girl with the Lower Back Tattoo (Gallery Books) - CD/Download/Streaming

Compilation appearances 
 2013: Women Who Kill (Tracks 1–3) (Entertainment One) - DVD/Download/Streaming
 2015: Comedy Central Stand-Up Vault# 3 (Comedy Central) - DVD
 2018: Just for Laughs: The Nasty Show, Vol. 1 (Tracks 1–2) - CD/Download/Streaming
 2018: Just for Laughs: The Nasty Show, Vol. 2 (Tracks 1–3) - CD/Download/Streaming
 2019: Just for Laughs: Funny AF, Vol. 1 (Track 1) - CD/Download/Streaming
 2019: Just for Laughs: Funny AF, Vol. 2 (Tracks 1–3) - CD/Download/Streaming
 2019: Just for Laughs: Funny AF, Vol. 3 (Track 1) - CD/Download/Streaming

Podcast 
 Amy Schumer Presents: 3 Girls, 1 Keith (2018–present, Host)

Bibliography

Awards and nominations

References

External links 

 
 
 
 

1981 births
21st-century American actresses
21st-century American comedians
Activists from New York (state)
Actresses from New York City
American feminists
American people of Ukrainian-Jewish descent
American people of English descent
American women podcasters
American podcasters
American sketch comedians
American stand-up comedians
American television actresses
American television directors
American television writers
American women comedians
American women screenwriters
American women television writers
Comedians from New York City
Emmy Award winners
Jewish American actresses
Jewish American female comedians
Jewish feminists
Last Comic Standing contestants
Living people
People from Long Island
People from the Upper East Side
People involved in plagiarism controversies
Screenwriters from New York (state)
South Side High School (Rockville Centre) alumni
Television producers from New York City
Towson University alumni
William Esper Studio alumni
American women television directors
American women television producers
Writers from Manhattan
21st-century American screenwriters
Schumer family